Salcha (Tanana: Soł Chaget, Tanacross: Saagescheeg) is a census-designated place (CDP) in Fairbanks North Star Borough in the U.S. state of Alaska. It is part of the Fairbanks, Alaska Metropolitan Statistical Area. The population was 1,095 at the 2010 census, up from 854 in 2000.

Geography
Salcha is located at  (64.520455, -147.011452). The village was first reported in 1898 by the U.S. Geological Survey as "Salchaket", deriving from the Tanana name Soł Chaget meaning "the mouth of Salcha". It is next to the Salcha River, a popular fishing destination. It is also next to the Tanana River. Salcha has its own post office. The ZIP code for Salcha is 99714.

Climate
Salcha has a dry-winter continental subarctic climate (Köppen Dwc).

Demographics

Salcha first appeared on the 1980 U.S. Census as a census-designated place (CDP).

As of the census of 2000, there were 854 people, 317 households, and 224 families residing in the CDP.  The population density was 11.9 people per square mile (4.6/km2).  There were 388 housing units at an average density of 5.4/sq mi (2.1/km2).  The racial makeup of the CDP was 87.82% White, 1.64% Black or African American, 3.86% Native American, 0.94% Asian, 0.23% Pacific Islander, 1.29% from other races, and 4.22% from two or more races.  2.81% of the population were Hispanic or Latino of any race.

There were 317 households, out of which 36.0% had children under the age of 18 living with them, 59.3% were married couples living together, 8.2% had a female householder with no husband present, and 29.3% were non-families. 21.5% of all households were made up of individuals, and 3.5% had someone living alone who was 65 years of age or older.  The average household size was 2.69 and the average family size was 3.16.

In the CDP, the population was spread out, with 29.6% under the age of 18, 5.9% from 18 to 24, 29.6% from 25 to 44, 28.6% from 45 to 64, and 6.3% who were 65 years of age or older.  The median age was 38 years. For every 100 females, there were 111.4 males.  For every 100 females age 18 and over, there were 115.4 males.

The median income for a household in the CDP was $54,063, and the median income for a family was $61,563. Males had a median income of $42,863 versus $26,071 for females. The per capita income for the CDP was $22,616.  None of the families and 3.9% of the population were living below the poverty line, including no under eighteens and none of those over 64.

References

Census-designated places in Alaska
Census-designated places in Fairbanks North Star Borough, Alaska